Union of Democratic Peasants/Party of Labour (UPD/PT) is a political party in Burkina Faso. The party was founded January 15, 2002. The party strives to achieve self-reliance in agricultural production.

In the 2006 municipal elections, UPD/PT obtained 46 votes.

References

Political parties in Burkina Faso